The FIL European Luge Championships 1976 took place in Hammarstrand, Sweden for the second time after previously hosted the championships in 1970. A record five countries won medals at these championships, breaking the previous record set in 1971 that was equalled in 1974.

Men's singles

Women's singles

Zozula is the first Soviet to win at the European championships.

Men's doubles

Norway earned its first medal at the championships since 1937.

Medal table

References
FIL-Luge.org list of European luge champions  - Accessed January 31, 2008.
Men's doubles European champions
Men's singles European champions
Women's singles European champions

FIL European Luge Championships
1976 in luge
Luge in Sweden
1976 in Swedish sport